Jeong Han Kim (born July 20, 1962) is a South Korean mathematician. 
He studied physics and mathematical physics at Yonsei University, and earned his Ph.D. in mathematics at Rutgers University. He was a researcher at AT&T Bell Labs and at Microsoft Research, and was Underwood Chair Professor of Mathematics at Yonsei University. He is currently a Professor of the School of Computational Sciences at the Korea Institute for Advanced Study.

His main research fields are combinatorics and computational mathematics. His best known contribution to the field is his proof that the Ramsey number R(3,t) has asymptotic order of magnitude t2/log t. He received the Fulkerson Prize in 1997 for his contributions to Ramsey theory.

In 2008, he became president of the National Institute for Mathematical Sciences of South Korea and was also awarded the Kyung-Ahm Prize. He was discharged of the position in 2011 after being accused of having allegedly misappropriated research funds. However, he was found not guilty by prosecution's investigation.

References

External links
Faculty page of Jeong Han Kim at Korea Institute for Advanced Study
Fulkerson Prize Winners at Mathematical Programming Society

Categories

1962 births
Living people
20th-century South Korean mathematicians
21st-century South Korean mathematicians
Graph theorists
Rutgers University alumni
Yonsei University alumni